Drysllwyn may refer to:

 Drysllwyn, Brisbane, a heritage-listed house in Queensland, Australia
 Dryslwyn Castle in Wales